KDesktop is the component of the K Desktop Environment 3 and earlier, which provides a virtual background window to draw icons or other graphics on. In conjunction with Kicker and SuperKaramba, it constitutes the graphical shell.

In KDE Software Compilation 4, Kicker, KDesktop, and SuperKaramba were replaced by KDE Plasma 4. The graphical shells KDE Plasma 4 and KDE Plasma 5 being widget engines of their own, SuperKaramba is no longer necessary and e.g. "Kicker" was re-implemented as a desktop widget.

References

See also
Linux on the desktop

KDE software